Grypocoris sexguttatus is a species of true bugs belonging to the family Miridae or plant bugs, subfamily Mirinae.

Description

Distribution and habitat
This species is present in most of Europe. The preferred habitat are spruce forest edges.

Biology
Nymphs can be found in May – June, while adults are present from June to August. These polyphagous bugs mainly feed on Heracleum sphondylium (nectar), Melampyrum pratense, Galeopsis tetrahit and Urtica dioica, but also on other insects, especially of the family Aphididae.

References

External links
 Biolib

Taxa named by Johan Christian Fabricius
Insects described in 1777
Mirini